Aiguèze is a commune in the Gard department in the Occitanie region of Southern France. In 2016, it had a population of 217. Since 2005, Aiguèze has been a member of Les Plus Beaux Villages de France ("The most beautiful villages of France"), the first such location in Gard.

Population

Sights

Aiguèze is a medieval village. The 14th century fort has a watchpath which provides fine views of the entrance to the Ardèche Gorges.

The origins of the parish church are Romanesque; a Renaissance doorway was removed in the 19th century. The interior was restored at the beginning of the 20th century with decor donated in 1910 by the Archbishop of Rouen, primate of Normandy, a native of the village. The church has been a listed monument historique since 1993.

Including the church, the commune has five sites recorded in the French Ministry of Culture list of historic sites.

See also
Communes of the Gard department

References

Communes of Gard
Plus Beaux Villages de France
Vivarais